Al Ain Football Club is an association football club based in Al Ain, Abu Dhabi, that competes in UAE Pro League, the top-division football league in United Arab Emirates. Founded in 1968 by players from Al Ain, members of a Bahraini group of exchange students and the Sudanese community working in the United Arab Emirates. Al Ain is one of only three clubs never to have been relegated from the top level of Emirati football since 1975–76 season, the others being Al Nasr and Al Wasl.

Key
 Pos. = Position
 Div. = Division
 C = Champion
 RU = Final (Runner-up) 
 SF = Semi-finals
 QF = Quarter-finals
 R16/R32 = Round of 16, round of 32, etc.
 R1/R2 = First round, second round, etc.
 GS = Group stage
 PO = Play-off
 QS = Qualifying Stage 
 W = Withdrew

Seasons

Pre-Football League era

Notes

Football League and Pro League era
{|class="wikitable"  style="text-align: center;"
|-
!Season!!Div.!!Pos.!!Pl.!!W!!D!!L!!GS!!GA!!GD!!P!!President's Cup!!Federation Cup / League Cup!!Super Cup!!colspan=2|GCC!!colspan=2|ACCC!!colspan=2|Asia!!colspan=2|Other!!colspan=2|Top scorer!!Manager
|-
|1975–76
| bgcolor=|1||bgcolor=silver|2nd||16||10||4||2||33||15||+18||24
|Not completed
|colspan="8"|Not held
|colspan="2"| –
|  
|  
| style="text-align:left;" | Ahmed Alyan
|-
|1977–78
| bgcolor=|1||bgcolor=silver|2nd||24||colspan="6"| –||34
|Not completed
|colspan="8"|Not held
|colspan="2"| –
|  
|  
| style="text-align:left;" | Ahmed Alyan
|-
|1978–79
| bgcolor=|1||bgcolor="#cc9966"|3rd||20||colspan="6"| –||27
|bgcolor=silver|Runner-ups
|colspan="8"|Not held
|colspan="2"| –
|  
|  
| style="text-align:left;" | Ahmed Alyan
|-
|1980–81
| bgcolor=|1||bgcolor=gold|1st||18||10||4||4||colspan="3"| –||24
|bgcolor=silver|Runner-ups
|colspan="8"|Not held
|colspan="2"| –
|  
|  
| style="text-align:left;" | Ahmed Nagah
|-
|1993–94
| bgcolor=|1||bgcolor=silver|2nd||18||12||5||1||31||10||+21||29
|bgcolor=silver|Runner-ups
|bgcolor=silver|Runner-ups
| –
|colspan="2"| –
|colspan="2"| –
|colspan="2"| –
|colspan="2"| –
|  
|  
| style="text-align:left;" | Amarildo
|-
|1994–95
| bgcolor=|1||bgcolor=silver|2nd||18||7||9||2||26||15||+11||23
|bgcolor=silver|Runner-ups
| –
|bgcolor=gold|Champions
|Gulf Club Champions Cup
|5th
|colspan="2"| –
|colspan="2"| –
|colspan="2"| –
|  
|  
| style="text-align:left;" | Amarildo Shaker Abdel-Fattah
|-
|1995–96
| bgcolor=|1||4th||23||8||7||8||20||18||+2||31
|Round of 16
|rowspan="4"|Not held
| –
|rowspan="5" colspan="2"| –
|rowspan="6" colspan="2"| –
|Asian Cup Winners' Cup
|R2
|rowspan="5" colspan="2"| –
|  
|  
| style="text-align:left;" | Ángel Marcos
|-
|1996–97
| bgcolor=|1||5th||28||10||11||7||40||31||+9||41
|Round of 16
|rowspan="5"|Not held
|rowspan="2" colspan="2"| –
|  
|  
| style="text-align:left;" | Lori Sandri Cabralzinho
|-
|1997–98
| bgcolor=|1||bgcolor=gold|1st||32||17||9||6||49||29||+20||61
|Semi-Finals
|  
|  
| style="text-align:left;" | Shaker Abdel-Fattah
|-
|1998–99
|1||bgcolor=silver|2nd||33||16||9||8||58||36||+22||57
|bgcolor=gold|Champions
|Asian Club Championship
|bgcolor="#cc9966"|3rd
|  
|  
| style="text-align:left;" | Nelo Vingada
|-
|1999–2000
| bgcolor=|1||bgcolor=gold|1st||22||13||7||2||48||25||+23||47
|Round of 16
|Group Stage
|Asian Cup Winners' Cup
|R1
|  
|  
| style="text-align:left;" | Ilie Balaci
|-
|2000–01
| bgcolor=|1||4th||22||10||4||8||33||27||+6||34
|bgcolor=gold|Champions
|Group Stage
|Gulf Club Champions Cup
|bgcolor=gold|C
|Asian Club Championship
|R2
|rowspan="23" colspan="2"| – 
|  
| 
| style="text-align:left;" | Oscar Fulloné Mrad Mahjoub Ahmed Abdullah * Anghel Iordănescu
|-
|2001–02
| bgcolor=|1||bgcolor=gold|1st||22||14||5||3||44||23||+21||47|Semi-Finals
|Group Stage
|bgcolor=silver|Runner-ups|rowspan="2" colspan="2"| –
|Arab Club Champions Cup
|W
|Asian Cup Winners' Cup
|QF
|  
|  
| style="text-align:left;" | Džemal Hadžiabdić
|-
|2002–03
| bgcolor=|1||bgcolor=gold|1st||22||14||6||2||51||20||+31||48|Quarter-finals
|rowspan="2" | Not held
|bgcolor=gold|Champions|rowspan="22" colspan="2"| –  
|AFC Champions League
|bgcolor=gold|C|  
|  
| style="text-align:left;" | Bruno Metsu
|-
|2003–04
| bgcolor=|1||bgcolor=gold|1st||16||11||3||2||34||17||+17||36|Semi-Finals
|rowspan="11"| Not held
|colspan="2"|Not held
|AFC Champions League
|bgcolor=FFFFCC|bye GS 
|   
|  
| style="text-align:left;" | Bruno Metsu
|-
|rowspan="3"|2004–05
|rowspan="3" bgcolor=|1||rowspan="3" bgcolor=silver|2nd||rowspan="3"|26||rowspan="3"|18||rowspan="3"|3||rowspan="3"|5||rowspan="3"|54||rowspan="3"|26||rowspan="3"|+28||rowspan="3"|57|rowspan="3" bgcolor=gold|Champions|rowspan="3" bgcolor=gold|Champions|rowspan="10" colspan="2"| –
|-
|AFC Champions League
|QF
|rowspan="2" style="text-align:left;" | Edílson 
|rowspan="2" |22
|rowspan="2" style="text-align:left;" | Alain Perrin Mohammad El Mansi * Milan Máčala
|-
|AFC Champions League
|bgcolor=FFFFCC|QF
|-
|rowspan="3"|2005–06
|rowspan="3" bgcolor=|1||rowspan="3"|4th||rowspan="3"|22||rowspan="3"|13||rowspan="3"|2||rowspan="3"|7||rowspan="3"|42||rowspan="3"|23||rowspan="3"|+19||rowspan="3"|41|rowspan="3" bgcolor=gold|Champions|rowspan="3" bgcolor=gold|Champions|-
|AFC Champions League
|bgcolor=silver|RU
|rowspan="2"  style="text-align:left;" |  Nenad Jestrović 
|rowspan="2" | 14
|rowspan="2"  style="text-align:left;" | Milan Máčala Mohammad El Mansi *
|-
|AFC Champions League
|bgcolor=FFFFCC|QF
|-
|rowspan="3"|2006–07
|rowspan="3" bgcolor=|1||rowspan="3"|9th||rowspan="3"|22||rowspan="3"|7||rowspan="3"|7||rowspan="3"|8||rowspan="3"|22||rowspan="3"|26||rowspan="3"|−4||rowspan="3"|28|rowspan="3" bgcolor=silver|Runner-ups|rowspan="3"|Group Stage	
|-
|AFC Champions League
|QF
|rowspan="2"   style="text-align:left;" |  Nenad Jestrović 
|rowspan="2"  | 9
|rowspan="2"  style="text-align:left;" |  Anghel Iordănescu Tiny Ruys *  Walter Zenga
|-
|AFC Champions League
|GS
|-
|2007–08
| bgcolor=|1||6th||22||9||5||8||41||36||+5||32|Round of 16
|Not held
|rowspan="2" colspan="2"| –
|style="text-align:left;" |  Ousman Jallow
| 11
| style="text-align:left;" | Tite  Winfried Schäfer
|-
|2008–09
| bgcolor=|1||bgcolor="#cc9966"|3rd||22||12||7||3||40||20||+20||43|bgcolor=gold|Champions|bgcolor=gold|Champions| –
|colspan="2"|Not held
| style="text-align:left;" | André Dias
| 23
|rowspan="1" style="text-align:left;" |  Winfried Schäfer
|-
|2009–10
| bgcolor=|1||bgcolor="#cc9966"|3rd||22||14||3||5||57||29||+28||45|Round of 16
|Semi-Finals
|bgcolor=gold|Champions|rowspan="8" colspan="2"| –
|AFC Champions League
|GS
| style="text-align:left;" | José Sand
| 33
| style="text-align:left;" |  Winfried Schäfer Rachid Benmahmoud * Toninho Cerezo Abdulhameed Al Mistaki *
|-
|2010–11
| bgcolor=|1|||10th||22||6||7||9||33||35||−2||25|Round of 16
|bgcolor=silver|Runner-ups
|rowspan="2" | –
|AFC Champions League
|GS
| style="text-align:left;" | José Sand Omar Abdulrahman
| 11
| style="text-align:left;" | Abdulhameed Al Mistaki * Ahmed Abdullah * Alexandre Gallo
|-
|2011–12
| bgcolor=|1||bgcolor=gold|1st||22||17||4||1||52||16||+36||55|Quarter-Finals
|Group Stage
|colspan="2"| –
| style="text-align:left;" | Asamoah Gyan
| 27
|rowspan="2" style="text-align:left;" |  Cosmin Olăroiu
|-
|2012–13
| bgcolor=|1||bgcolor=gold|1st||26||20||2||4||74||26||+48||62|Semi-Finals
|Group Stage
|bgcolor=gold|Champions|AFC Champions League
|GS
| style="text-align:left;" | Asamoah Gyan
| 32
|-
|2013–14
| bgcolor=|1||6th||26||12||7||7||52||33||+19||43|bgcolor=gold|Champions|Group Stage
|bgcolor=silver|Runner-ups|AFC Champions League
|bgcolor=FFFFCC|QF
| style="text-align:left;" | Asamoah Gyan
| 45
|style="text-align:left;" |  Jorge Fossati  Ahmed Abdullah * Quique Flores Zlatko Dalić
|-
|rowspan="3"|2014–15
|rowspan="3"|1||bgcolor=gold rowspan="3"|1st||rowspan="3"|26||rowspan="3"|18||rowspan="3"|6||rowspan="3"|2||rowspan="3"|62||rowspan="3"|19||rowspan="3"|+43||rowspan="3"|60|rowspan="3"|Quarter-Finals
|rowspan="3"|Group Stage
|rowspan="3" bgcolor=silver|Runner-ups|-
|AFC Champions League
|SF
|rowspan="2" style="text-align:left;"| Asamoah Gyan
|rowspan="2" | 24
|rowspan="3" style="text-align:left;"| Zlatko Dalić
|-
|AFC Champions League
|R16
|-
|2015–16
|1||bgcolor=silver|2nd|||26||18||3||5||53||24||+29||57| bgcolor=silver|Runner-ups|Group Stage
| bgcolor=gold|Champions|rowspan="3" colspan="2"|Cancelled
|AFC Champions League
|bgcolor=FFFFCC|QF
|Emirati-Moroccan Super Cup
|bgcolor=gold|C
|style="text-align:left;"| Dyanfres Douglas
| 18
|-
|rowspan="2"|2016–17
|rowspan="2"|1||rowspan="2"|4th||rowspan="2"|26||rowspan="2"|17||rowspan="2"|4||rowspan="2"|5||rowspan="2"|58||rowspan="2"|37||rowspan="2"|+21||rowspan="2"|55|rowspan="2"|Quarter-Finals
|rowspan="2"|Group Stage
|rowspan="4"| –
|rowspan="2"|Arab Club Champions Cup
|rowspan="2"|W
|AFC Champions League
| bgcolor=silver|RU
|rowspan="4" colspan="2"| –
|rowspan="2" style="text-align:left;"| Caio Lucas 
|rowspan="2"| 18
|rowspan="2" style="text-align:left;"| Zlatko Dalić Joško Španjić * Zoran Mamić
|-
|AFC Champions League
|bgcolor=FFFFCC|QF
|-
|rowspan="2"|2017–18
|rowspan="2"|1||rowspan="2" bgcolor=gold |1st||rowspan="2"|22||rowspan="2"|16||rowspan="2"|5||rowspan="2"|1||rowspan="2"|65||rowspan="2"|23||rowspan="2"|+42||rowspan="2"|53|rowspan="2" bgcolor=gold|Champions|rowspan="2"|Quarter-Finals
|rowspan="6" colspan="2"|Not held
|rowspan="2" colspan="2"| –
|AFC Champions League
|QF
|rowspan="2" style="text-align:left;"| Marcus Berg 
|rowspan="2"| 35
|rowspan="2" style="text-align:left;"| Zoran Mamić
|-
|AFC Champions League
|R16
|-
|2018–19
|1||4th||26||14||4||8||45||35||+10||46|Round of 16
|Quarter-Finals
|bgcolor=silver|Runner-ups|Arab Club Champions Cup
|R32
|AFC Champions League
|GS
|FIFA Club World Cup
|bgcolor=silver|RU| style="text-align:left;"| Caio Lucas
| 17
| style="text-align:left;"| Zoran Mamić Željko Sopić * Juan Garrido
|-bgcolor="lightpink"
|2019–20
|1||2nd||19||11||4||4||46||21||+25||37|Finalists
|Semi-Finals
| –
|rowspan="4" colspan="2" bgcolor=#F8F9FA| –
|bgcolor=#F8F9FA|AFC Champions League
|bgcolor=#F8F9FA|GS
|rowspan="4" colspan="2" bgcolor=#F8F9FA| –
|bgcolor=#F8F9FA style="text-align:left;"| Kodjo Laba 
|bgcolor=#F8F9FA |28
|bgcolor=#F8F9FA style="text-align:left;"| Ivan Leko Ghazi Fahad * Pedro Emanuel
|-
|2020–21
|1||6th||26||11||8||7||39||33||+6||41|Round of 16
|First Round	
|rowspan="2" | –
|AFC Champions League
|QS
| style="text-align:left;"| Kodjo Laba 
|13
|style="text-align:left;"| Pedro Emanuel
|-
|2021–22
| bgcolor=|1||bgcolor=gold|1st||26||20||5||1||57||17||+40||65|Quarter-finals
|bgcolor=gold|Champions|colspan="2" | –	
| style="text-align:left;"| Kodjo Laba 
|31
|style="text-align:left;"| Serhii Rebrov
|}Notes'''

References

External links
 Al Ain FC official website 

Seasons
 
Al Ain FC
Seasons